Michael John "Pasty" Harris (born 25 May 1944) is a former English first-class cricketer who played for various teams. He played from 1964 until 1982 in a 344-game First class career which took him to South Africa and New Zealand.

Early life
Harris was born in St Just in Roseland, Cornwall, in 1944. His nickname of "Pasty" referred to his Cornish origins.

Playing career
In England he represented Nottinghamshire, for whom he scored over 15,000 runs, and Middlesex County Cricket Club, playing as a right-handed batsman and, from 1969 until around 1972, as a useful leg spin bowler. From 1974 to 1977, Nottinghamshire used him as their wicketkeeper, as David Pullan, the incumbent, was a poor batsman. Harris hit nine centuries, equalling the county record, in 1971 when he scored 2238 runs.

In 1974, Harris was selected to tour Rhodesia with the International Wanderers, a private touring team organised by Brian Close.

A prolific batsman in county cricket, he was selected on standby for the 1974–75 Ashes tour but was superseded by Colin Cowdrey.

Umpiring career
Harris later became an umpire, officiating at List A level from 1985 to 2008 and at First class level from 1988 to 2008.

References

External links

 

1944 births
Living people
Sportspeople from Cornwall
English cricketers
English cricket umpires
Nottinghamshire cricketers
Wellington cricketers
Eastern Province cricketers
Middlesex cricketers
People from St Just in Roseland
Marylebone Cricket Club cricketers
Wicket-keepers
Marylebone Cricket Club President's XI cricketers